Pax is a genus of Asian ant spiders first described by G. Levy in 1990.

Species
 it contains 7 species:
Pax ellipita (Zamani & Marusik, 2021) — Iran
Pax engediensis Levy, 1990 — Israel
Pax islamita (Simon, 1873) — Turkey, Israel, Syria, Lebanon
Pax leila (Zamani & Marusik, 2021) — Iran
Pax libani (Simon, 1873) — Israel, Lebanon
Pax meadi (O. Pickard-Cambridge, 1872) — Israel, Jordan
Pax palmonii Levy, 1990 — Israel

References

Zodariidae
Araneomorphae genera